The Charles Kuonen Suspension Bridge is the third longest hanging bridge for pedestrian use in the world. It is located in Randa, Switzerland and replaced the defunct , which had been damaged by a rock slide. The bridge spans 494 meters (1621 feet), and upon its inauguration on 30  July 2017 became the longest suspension bridge built for pedestrian travel. The bridge runs 85 metres (279 feet) above the ground at its highest point. It employs  of cables, and has a system that prevents it from swinging. The bridge is part of Europaweg, a hiking path between the Swiss villages of Zermatt and Grächen.

See also
 List of notable pedestrian bridges

References

Bridges completed in 2017
Pedestrian bridges in Switzerland
Simple suspension bridges
21st-century architecture in Switzerland